The Portrait of Frédéric Chopin and George Sand was an 1838 unfinished oil-on-canvas painting by French artist Eugène Delacroix. 

He made sketches for it before 1838, a more detailed one of Chopin alone and another, more coarse one of the two. Later he painted it originally as a double portrait, which was later cut in two and sold off as separate pieces. It showed composer Frédéric Chopin (1810–49) playing the piano while writer George Sand (1804–76) sits to his right, listening and sewing (a favorite activity of hers). The sitters were lovers at the time, and both were close friends of the artist. 

The portrait remained in Delacroix's studio until his death. Shortly afterward, it was cut into two separate works, both of which are tightly focused. Chopin's portrait comprises only a head shot, while Sand's shows her upper body but is narrowly cut. This led to the loss of large areas of the original canvas. The reason for the divide is likely the then-owner's belief that two paintings would sell for a higher price than one. Today Chopin's portrait is housed at the Louvre in Paris, while Sand's hangs at Copenhagen's Ordrupgaard Museum.

George Sand was a French Romantic novelist, one of the first female French writers to establish an international reputation. She became known for behavior unusual for a woman at the time, including openly conducting affairs, smoking a pipe and wearing men's clothing. Sand had been a friend of Delacroix for a number of years, though the painter did not hold her work in high regard. She met Chopin in 1836 and from 1838 conducted a relationship with him for ten years, until two years before he died. Much of the composer's best work was done during those ten years. Though their relationship began as physical, Chopin's failing health (described in Sand's autobiographical "Winter in 
Mallorca") in time changed her role to that of caregiver. 

Sand introduced Delacroix to Chopin in 1838, and the two men remained close friends until the composer's death.
The double portrait showed Chopin playing the piano while Sand sat and listened. Little is known of the painting's origin or the circumstances of its execution. It is not known whether it was a commission or intended as a gift to the composer. It is known that Delacroix borrowed a piano so that the work could be painted in his studio. The double portrait was not finished, and one of the elements that was not painted was the piano.

The Sand canvas is generally seen as the more interesting because, in its original form, it was intended as a counterpoint to the Chopin portrait, not as a stand-alone work. As such, it contravenes many conventions of portraiture. It was usual in 19th-century bust-sized paintings for the subject to be largely static, but here Sand is shown reacting to the music Chopin is playing, and highly animated and energetic in her emotional response.

Notes

References
 Halina Goldberg, The Age of Chopin: Interdisciplinary Inquiries, Indiana University Press, 2004, 
 Gilles Néret, Delacroix, Berlin, Taschen, 2000,

Further reading
 

1838 paintings
Paintings by Eugène Delacroix
Unfinished paintings
Chopin
Musical instruments in art
Portrait paintings in the Louvre
Paintings in the collection of the Ordrupgaard
Paintings in the Louvre by French artists
Cultural depictions of Frédéric Chopin
Cultural depictions of George Sand